The University of Crete (UoC; Greek: Πανεπιστήμιο Κρήτης) is a multi-disciplinary, research-oriented institution in Crete, Greece, located in the cities of Rethymno (official seat) and Heraklion, and one of the country's most academically acclaimed and reputable universities.

There are 16 main undergraduate degree programmes corresponding to the university's departments and more than 30 master's programmes.

As of 2017, there is a student population of 16.000 registered undergraduates and 2.500 registered postgraduates, more than 500 Faculty members as well as approximately 420 administrative staff.

The university ranked 62nd in The Times Higher Education (THE) 2018 list of the top universities aged 50 years or under.

Overview
The University of Crete was established in 1973 and started functioning in the academic year 1977–78.

As with all universities in Greece, the University of Crete is a public university and as such it operates under the supervision of the state and all its educational activities, as well as a part of its research activities, rely upon government funding. The supreme administrative body of the university is the Senate, which is presided over by the rector of the university. The head of the university is the rector, who is assisted by three vice-rectors in the exercise of his duties; all four together form the institution's high authority. They are elected for a period of four years by the teaching staff and representatives of the student body.

Although still very young, the University of Crete has already shown its commitment in the evolving process of European integration, and it operates as an integral member of the European Research and Education Areas. It is currently coordinating and participating in European Union programs and activities such as ERASMUS, LINGUA, and TEMPUS and has important links and cooperations with other Mediterranean and Eastern European countries as well as with many American universities and colleges, through international programmes.

The university encourages active participation in cultural and athletic activities. The student union also operates a radio station.

Emblem of the University of Crete
The emblem of the University of Crete is based on a Hellenistic coin found in Gortyn (430-300 B.B.) and depicts Europa in reflecting stance while sitting on olive tree branches. The emblem was designed in a medal by the sculptor Aspasia Papadoperaki.

Faculties and departments 

The university has sixteen departments organised in five schools according to related disciplines.

Its two campuses are located near two towns on the north coast of the island, Galos in Rethymnon and Voutes in Heraklion.

Research

The University of Crete is well known both nationally and internationally for its state of the art research and graduate programmes.

It is considered one of the best universities in Greece mainly due to its research influence: it ranks in the top 400 Universities of the World by The Times Higher Education list, and also in the top 100 universities under 50 years by the QS World University Rankings.

On several research topics the University of Crete collaborates closely with FO.R.T.H.

The Natural History Museum of Crete, established in 1981 at Heraklion, is also part of the University of Crete.

Academic evaluation

An external evaluation of all academic departments in Greek universities was conducted by the Hellenic Quality Assurance and Accreditation Agency (HQAA) in the years 2008–2014 and, according to these results, the University of Crete, was characterised as a "Center of Excellence".

In 2016 the external evaluation of the institution cited University of Crete as Worthy of merit.

The reports are publicly available.

See also
 List of universities in Greece
 Technical University of Crete
 Foundation for Research & Technology – Hellas
 Open access in Greece

References

External links
 University of Crete Official Website 
 University of Crete Internal Quality Assurance Unit 
 Hellenic Quality Assurance and Accreditation Agency (HQA) 
 Kallipos (e-books Greek academic publishing) 
 Greek Research & Technology Network (GRNET) 
 okeanos (GRNET's cloud service) 
 synnefo – Open Source Cloud Software (GRNET) 
 Hellenic Universities Rectors' Synod 
 Hellenic Universities Faculty Association 
 Job Fair Athens 

 
University of Crete
Educational institutions established in 1973
1973 establishments in Greece